Fredericktown is a census-designated place located in East Bethlehem Township, Washington County in the state of Pennsylvania.  The community was part of the Fredericktown-Millsboro CDP for the 2000 census, but was split into two separate CDPs for the 2010 census, the other community being Millsboro.  Fredericktown is located in far southern Washington County, along Pennsylvania Route 88, which travels along the Monongahela River.  As of the 2010 census the population was 403 residents.

Demographics

References

Census-designated places in Washington County, Pennsylvania
Pennsylvania populated places on the Monongahela River
Census-designated places in Pennsylvania